Tom Cruse (born 30 March 1989) is an English rugby union player who plays hooker for Edinburgh Rugby.

Cruse began his senior playing career at Stockport RUFC where his talent was apparent, earning him a place at the Sale Sharks academy. After a season with Sale, he signed his first professional contract with Rotherham Titans in the RFU Championship from the 2013-14 season. 

Cruse was the stand-out hooker in the RFU Championship in the 2015 season while playing for Rotherham Titans, before signing with London Irish for the 2015/16 season. 

In early March 2016, Cruse announced his move to Wasps for that season. Since then, Cruse has earned a reputation as one of the most mobile front row forwards in the Premiership. He signed a contract extension ahead of the 2021–22 season.

Wasps entered administration on 17 October 2022 and Cruse was made redundant along with all other players and coaching staff. On 22 November 2022 Edinburgh Rugby confirmed the signing of Cruse on a short-term deal.

References

External links
Wasps profile
ESPN profile
Its Rugby Profile
Ultimate Rugby Profile

1989 births
Living people
English rugby union players
Sale Sharks players
London Irish players
Rotherham Titans players
Rugby union hookers
Rugby union players from Stockport
Wasps RFC players
Edinburgh Rugby players